The COVID-19 pandemic in Tuvalu is part of the ongoing worldwide pandemic of coronavirus disease 2019 caused by severe acute respiratory syndrome coronavirus 2. The virus was confirmed to have reached Tuvalu on 20 May 2022. As of 31 August 2022, a total of 25,591 vaccine doses have been administered.

Background
On 12 January 2020, the World Health Organization (WHO) confirmed that a novel coronavirus was the cause of a respiratory illness in a cluster of people in Wuhan, Hubei Province, China, which was reported to the WHO on 31 December 2019.

The case fatality ratio for COVID-19 has been much lower than SARS of 2003, but the transmission has been significantly greater, with a significant total death toll.

Timeline

2020 
Circa 26 March 2020, the acting governor general declared a state of emergency.

2021 
As of 24 August 2021 in reporting to the WHO, there had been zero confirmed COVID-19 cases; and as of 15 August, 4,772 vaccines doses had been administered. On 2 November, a traveller from Tuvalu tested positive when arriving to New Zealand, suggesting possible spread of the virus in the country, but no cases had been officially reported by the local authorities of the country.

2022 
Acting Prime Minister Minute Alapati Taupo on 20 May 2022 announced that three cases were detected in quarantine, while other three cases are suspicious.

On 31 October, 140 positives cases were reported by the WHO.

On 3rd November 2022, the government of Tuvalu announced the first community outbreak.

Statistics

Cases by islands and atolls

References

COVID-19 pandemic in Tuvalu
Tuvalu
2020 in Tuvalu
2021 in Tuvalu
2022 in Tuvalu
2023 in Tuvalu
Tuvalu